KCTX-FM (96.1 FM) is a radio station broadcasting a Country music format. Licensed to Childress, Texas, United States, the station is currently owned by James G. Boles, Jr.

History
The station was assigned the call letters KQAI on April 5, 1984. On September 29, 1986, the station changed its call sign to KSRW, and on February 23, 2001, to the current KCTX.

References

External links
 

CTX-FM